is an autobahn located between Hamburg and Buchholz in der Nordheide. It connects the A 7 with the A 1.

Exit list

|}

External links 

261
A261
A261